USCGC Pontchartrain was a  belonging to the United States Coast Guard launched on 16 June 1928 and commissioned on 13 October 1928 . After 13 years of service in the Coast Guard, she was transferred to the Royal Navy as part of the Lend-Lease Act. She was sunk in 1942 off Oran Harbor.

Career

US Coast Guard - Pontchartrain 
After commissioning in November 1928, Pontchartrain was homeported in Norfolk, Virginia and assigned to the Bering Sea Patrol.

On 4 December 1940 Pontchartrain rescued the entire crew of the 70 foot tugboat Edwin Duke which was in danger of sinking in a storm south of Long Island.

Royal Navy - Hartland 
As part of the Lend-Lease Act she was transferred to the Royal Navy where she was renamed HMS Hartland (Y00) and commissioned on 30 April 1941. In November 1942, while taking part in Operation Reservist carrying American troops to seize the harbour of Oran, Algiers she was sunk by gunfire from the French destroyer Typhon within the Oran Harbor taking 34 crew members with her.

See also
 List of United States Coast Guard cutters

References

Lake-class cutters
Banff-class sloops
Ships of the United States Coast Guard
World War II sloops of the United Kingdom
Maritime incidents in November 1942
World War II shipwrecks in the Mediterranean Sea